The Adolph O. Eberhart House is a historic house in Mankato, Minnesota, United States.  It was built around 1903 for politician Adolph Olson Eberhart (1870–1944), who served as a state senator, lieutenant governor, and governor of Minnesota.  It was listed on the National Register of Historic Places in 1980 for its local significance in the theme of politics/government.  It was nominated for its association with Eberhart. In 1995 it was listed as a contributing property to the Lincoln Park Residential Historic District.

See also
 National Register of Historic Places listings in Blue Earth County, Minnesota

References

1903 establishments in Minnesota
Colonial Revival architecture in Minnesota
Governor of Minnesota
Houses completed in 1903
Houses in Blue Earth County, Minnesota
Houses on the National Register of Historic Places in Minnesota
Mankato, Minnesota
National Register of Historic Places in Blue Earth County, Minnesota